In mathematics, the n-dimensional complex coordinate space (or complex n-space) is the set of all ordered n-tuples of complex numbers.  It is denoted , and is the n-fold Cartesian product of the complex plane  with itself.  Symbolically,

or

The variables  are the (complex) coordinates on the complex n-space. 

Complex coordinate space is a vector space over the complex numbers, with componentwise addition and scalar multiplication. With the standard Euclidean topology,  is a topological vector space over the complex numbers.

A function on an open subset of complex n-space is holomorphic if it is holomorphic in each complex coordinate separately.  Several complex variables is the study of such holomorphic functions in n variables.  More generally, the complex n-space is the target space for holomorphic coordinate systems on complex manifolds.

See also
 Coordinate space

References
 

Several complex variables
Topological vector spaces